Gigliola Cinquetti (born Giliola Cinquetti on 20 December 1947) is an Italian singer, songwriter, and television presenter.

Life and career
Gigliola Cinquetti was born into a wealthy family in Verona. From the ages of 9 to 13, she studied and took piano lessons, taking exams in music theory.  She loves painting and art.  Her career as a professional singer began when she was 16. 

At the age of 16 she won the Sanremo Music Festival in 1964 singing "Non ho l'età" ("I'm not old enough"), with music composed by Mario Panzeri and lyrics by Nicola Salerno. Her win enabled her to represent Italy in the Eurovision Song Contest 1964 in Copenhagen with the same song, where she claimed her country's first ever victory in the event. Cinquetti became the youngest winner of the contest, aged 16 years and 92 days. Only one younger artist has triumphed since: Sandra Kim in 1986.

The song became an international success, even spending 17 weeks in the UK Singles Chart and ending the year as the 88th best-selling single in the U.K. in 1964, something highly unusual for Italian-language material. It sold over three million copies, and was awarded a platinum disc in August 1964. In 1966, she recorded "Dio, come ti amo" ("God, How I Love You"), which became another international hit.

One of her other songs, "Alle porte del sole" (released in 1973), was re-recorded in both English (as "To the Door of the Sun") and Italian by Al Martino, two years after its initial release; "To the Door of the Sun" reached No. 17 on Billboard'''s Hot 100 in the United States. Cinquetti's own English version of the song was released as a single by CBS Records in August 1974, with her original 1973 Italian version on the B-side.

Cinquetti returned in the Eurovision Song Contest 1974, held in Brighton, where she again represented Italy. Performing the song "Sì" ("Yes"), the music and lyrics of which were written by Mario Panzeri, Daniele Pace, Lorenzo Pilat and Carrado Conti, she came second with 18 points after "Waterloo", sung by Sweden's ABBA, who won with 24 points. The live telecast of her song was banned in her home country by the Italian national broadcaster RAI, as the event partially coincided with the campaigning for the 1974 Italian divorce referendum which was to be held a month later in May. RAI censored the song because of concerns that the name and lyrics of the song (which constantly repeated the word 'Sì') could be accused of being a subliminal message and a form of propaganda to influence the Italian voting public to vote 'Yes' in the referendum. The song remained censored on most Italian state TV and radio stations for over a month. Cinquetti later recorded versions of the song in English ("Go (Before You Break My Heart)"), French ("Lui"), German ("Ja") and Spanish ("Si"). The English-language version reached number 8 in the UK Singles Chart in June 1974.

She graduated from the art school of Salerno, also obtaining the qualification to teach. She married Luciano Teodori in 1979, and they have two children together — Giovanni and Costantino. She has a sister named Rosabianca. Her parents are Luigi and Sara.

In the 1990s, Cinquetti became a professional journalist and TV presenter, and among others she hosted the current affairs programme Italia Rai on RAI International. She later co-hosted the Eurovision Song Contest 1991 with Toto Cutugno, who had brought the event to Italy with his victory in Zagreb the previous year – the country's first win in the contest since her own twenty-six years earlier.

In 2008, Cinquetti received an award as a tribute to her career in Italy and around the world. She published an autobiography in 2014.

Sanremo performances
In the following occasions, Gigliola Cinquetti performed at the Sanremo Music Festival:
1964 "Non ho l'età (per amarti)" – with Patricia Carli
1965 "Ho bisogno di vederti" – with Connie Francis
1966 "Dio come ti amo" – with Domenico Modugno
1968 "Sera" – with Giuliana Valci
1969 "La pioggia" – with France Gall
1970 "Romantico blues" with Bobby Solo
1971 "Rose nel buio" – with Ray Conniff
1972 "Gira l'amore (Caro bebè)"
1973 "Mistero"
1985 "Chiamalo amore"'
1989 "Ciao"
1995 "Giovane vecchio cuore"

Discography
 Studio albums 
 Gigliola Cinquetti (1964)
 La rosa nera (1967)
 Gigliola per i più piccini (1967)
 L'orage (1969)
 Il treno dell'amore (1969)
 Cantando con gli amici (1971)
 ... E io le canto così (1972)
 Fidèlement votre... (1972)
 Su e giù per le montagne (1972)
 Stasera ballo liscio (1973)
 Bonjour Paris (1974)
 Auf der Strasse der Sonne (1974)
 Go (Before You Break My Heart) (1974)
 Gigliola e la banda (1975)
 Pensieri di donna (1978)
 Il portoballo (1982)
 Tuttintorno (1991)
 Giovane vecchio cuore (1995)
 I successi (1999)
 20.12'' (2016)

Charting singles

Filmography

Films

Television

See also

 Bésame Mucho
Sanremo Music Festival
Eurovision Song Contest
Italy in the Eurovision Song Contest
Eurovision Song Contest 1974
Sì (song)
List of Eurovision Song Contest presenters

Notes

References

External links

 grattia.com Gigliola Cinquetti Videos
 Russian page about Gigliola Cinquetti

1947 births
Living people
Musicians from Verona
Italian women singers
Eurovision Song Contest entrants for Italy
Eurovision Song Contest entrants of 1964
Eurovision Song Contest entrants of 1974
Eurovision Song Contest winners
Sanremo Music Festival winners
Spanish-language singers of Italy
Mass media people from Verona
Italian singers
Italian singer-songwriters
Italian women singer-songwriters
Italian singers by century
Celebrities in popular culture